The Searching Wind is a 1946 American feature film directed by  William Dieterle and starring Robert Young, Sylvia Sidney, and Ann Richards. It is based on the play of the same name by Lillian Hellman. It had originally been planned for producer Hal Wallis to make the film at Warner Bros., but after he left the studio he brought the project to Paramount Pictures.

Synopsis
In 1945, after hearing of the death of Mussolini, an American career diplomat and his family reflect on his mistakes he made during the interwar years.

Cast
Robert Young as Alex Hazen
Sylvia Sidney as Cassie Bowman
Ann Richards as Emily Hazen
Dudley Digges as Moses
Douglas Dick as Sam Hazen 
Albert Basserman as Count Von Stammer
Dan Seymour as Torrone
Ian Wolfe as Sears
Marietta Canty as Sophronia
Norma Varden as Mrs. Hayworth
Charles D. Brown as Carter
Don Castle as David
William Trenk as Ponette
Mickey Kuhn as Sam as a Boy

Original play
Hellman's play debuted on Broadway in 1944 and ran for 318 performances. Montgomery Clift was in the original cast.

References

Bibliography
 Dick, Bernard F. Hal Wallis: Producer to the Stars. University Press of Kentucky, 2015.

External links

The Searching Wind at New York Times

1946 films
1946 drama films
American black-and-white films
American films based on plays
American war drama films
Films based on works by Lillian Hellman
Films directed by William Dieterle
Films produced by Hal B. Wallis
Films scored by Victor Young
Films set in Washington, D.C.
Films set in Paris
Films set in Berlin
Films set in Rome
Films set in the 1920s
Films set in the 1930s
Films set in the 1940s
Paramount Pictures films
Films with screenplays by Lillian Hellman
American World War II films
1940s war drama films
1940s English-language films
1940s American films